Maksymilian Barański (14 April 1926 – 9 May 2010) was a Polish footballer. He played in five matches for the Poland national football team in 1947.

References

External links
 

1926 births
2010 deaths
Polish footballers
Poland international footballers
Place of birth missing
Association football forwards
AKS Chorzów players